The OFW Family Club, Inc. is a political organization with party-list representation in the House of Representatives of the Philippines. It aims to represents the interests of Overseas Filipino Workers (OFWs).

Background
The OFW Family Club has been providing aid to Overseas Filipino Workers (OFWs) and their families since 1998. It was established as a non-governmental organization in 2000 by former diplomat Roy Señeres, his family and volunteers. In the 2013 election, the group vied for party-list representation in the House of Representatives where it won two seats.

The organization loss its seats after failing to garner enough votes in the 2016 elections.

In the 2019 elections, OFW Family Club won back a seat.Bobby Pacquiao, brother of senator and professional boxer Manny Pacquiao, filled in the seat.
In the 18th Congress, the House of Representatives passed a bill proposed the creation of the Department of Migrant Workers which eventually became law. The OFW Family Club is one of its principal authors.

It took part in the 2022 elections but failed to win a single seat.

Electoral performance

Representatives to Congress

References

Party-lists represented in the House of Representatives of the Philippines